Eilema contorta is a moth of the subfamily Arctiinae. It was described by John Fryer in 1912. It is found on the Seychelles.

References

contorta
Moths described in 1912
Fauna of Seychelles